Sky News at 9 is a daily hour long news programme on Sky News, airing between 9:00 pm and 10:00 pm. It is a round-up of the day's top stories with analysis from Sky's correspondents. The show is presented by Anna Botting from Monday to Thursday and Anna Jones on Friday to Sunday.

Format
Sky News at 9 is an hour-long newscast digesting the day's stories plus providing analysis and live interviews. The final minutes of the programme often feature a look at the first of the next day's national newspaper front pages as well as a look ahead to Sky News at 10. Sky News at 9 is a longer form news bulletin than the 30-minute newscasts - such as Sky News at Ten - that follow it in the schedule.

On Saturday and Sunday, the Sky News at 9 presenter starts their shift an hour earlier hosting the 8 pm hour of Sky News. This hour uses the same studio setup and backdrop as Sky News at 9.

Frequent relief presenters of the slot include Jonathan Samuels and Jayne Secker, while Anna Jones often covers weekday editions of the programme when Anna Botting isn't available.

Current presenters

References

2012 British television series debuts
2000s British television series
2020s British television series
Sky News
Sky UK original programming
Sky television news shows